Ondéfidouo is a town in northeastern Ivory Coast. It is a sub-prefecture of Bouna Department in Bounkani Region, Zanzan District.

Ondéfidouo was a commune until March 2012, when it became one of 1126 communes nationwide that were abolished.

In 2014, the population of the sub-prefecture of Ondéfidouo was 28,088.

Villages
The twenty five villages of the sub-prefecture of Ondéfidouo and their population in 2014 are:
 Bigebdouo (395)
 Gangodouo (434)
 Hompountédouo (509)
 Kermatédouo (964)
 Kinéta (1 130)
 Kissarédouo (1 035)
 Kontodouo (2 366)
 Koulamboronidouo (573)
 Koulkantédouo (665)
 Kounandouo (335)
 Kpokpokouédouo (697)
 Léfitédouo (479)
 Léomidouo (4 258)
 Lindi (864)
 Ondéfidouo (4 283)
 Piayé (1 548)
 Polédouo 2 (321)
 Sépidouo (1 440)
 Sitédouo (506)
 Siyalédouo (3 243)
 Tchalarédouo (306)
 Tchatiédouo 2 (520)
 Téfatédouo (162)
 Tessodouo (983)
 Todjirédouo (72)

Notes

Sub-prefectures of Bounkani
Former communes of Ivory Coast